In computer science, the occurs check is a part of algorithms for syntactic unification.  It causes unification of a variable V and a structure S to fail if S contains V.

Application in theorem proving

In theorem proving, unification without the occurs check can lead to unsound inference. For example, the Prolog goal

will succeed, binding X to a cyclic structure which has no counterpart in the Herbrand universe.
As another example, 

without occurs-check, a resolution proof can be found for the non-theorem 

Rational Tree Unification

Prolog implementations usually omit the occurs check for reasons of efficiency, which can lead to circular data structures and looping. 
By not performing the occurs check, the worst case complexity of unifying a term
 with term 
is reduced in many cases from

to
;
in the particular, frequent case of variable-term unifications, runtime shrinks to 
.

Modern implementations, based on Colmerauer's Prolog II,

use rational tree unification to avoid looping. However it is difficult to keep the complexity time linear in the presence of cyclic terms. Examples where Colmerauers algorithm becomes quadratic  can be readily constructed, but refinement proposals exist.

See image for an example run of the unification algorithm given in Unification (computer science)#A unification algorithm, trying to solve the goal , however without the occurs check rule (named "check" there); applying rule "eliminate" instead leads to a cyclic graph (i.e. an infinite term) in the last step.

Sound Unification

ISO Prolog implementations have the built-in predicate unify_with_occurs_check/2 for sound unification but are free to use unsound or even looping algorithms when unification is invoked otherwise, provided the algorithm works correctly for all cases that are "not subject to occurs-check" (NSTO). The built-in acyclic_term/1 serves to check the finiteness of terms.

Implementations offering sound unification for all unifications are Qu-Prolog and Strawberry Prolog and (optionally, via a runtime flag): XSB, SWI-Prolog, Tau Prolog, and Scryer Prolog. A variety
 of optimizations can render sound unification feasible for common cases.

See also

Notes

References

Automated theorem proving
Logic programming
Programming constructs
Unification (computer science)